180-line is an early electronic television system. It was used in Germany after March 22, 1935, using telecine transmission of film, intermediate film system, or cameras using the Nipkow disk. Simultaneously, fully electronic transmissions using cameras based on the iconoscope began on January 15, 1936 with a definition of 375-lines.

The Berlin Summer Olympic Games were televised, using both closed-circuit 375-line fully electronic iconoscope-based cameras and 180 lines intermediate film cameras transmitting to Berlin, Hamburg, Munich, Nuremberg and Bayreuth via  special Reichspost long distance cables in August 1936. In Berlin, twenty-eight public 180-line television rooms were opened for anybody who did not own a television set.

System details:

Some TV sets for this system were available, like the French Grammont models, Telefunken FE II and FE III or Fernseh Tischmodell

After February 1937 both 180 and 375-line systems were replaced by a superior 441-line system.

References

External links 

 http://www.compulink.co.uk/~rrussell/tccgen/manual/tcgen0.html Colour Test Card Generator - Introduction and specification

Television technology
History of television